Jeison Manuel Rosario Bastardo (born 7 April 1995) is a Dominican professional boxer who held the unified WBA (Super) and IBF light middleweight titles in 2020.

Professional career

Rosario vs. Williams 
Rosario compiled a record of 19–1–1 before facing and defeating Julian Williams to win the WBA (Super), IBF, and IBO light middleweight titles.

Rosario vs. Charlo 
In his next bout, Rosario faced WBC and The Ring super welterweight champion Jermell Charlo. Rosario was knocked down by Charlo with a left jab in the eight round and wasn't able to get up, earning Charlo the KO victory.

After losing by TKO to Jermell Charlo, there have been hopes of Rosario facing Erickson Lubin.

Rosario vs. Lubin 
In his next fight, Rosario did face Erickson Lubin, who was ranked #1 by the WBC and #6 by The Ring at super welterweight. Lubin dropped Rosario twice in the sixth round, the second one being the final for Rosario and earning Lubin a KO victory over him.

Professional boxing record

See also
List of world light-middleweight boxing champions

References

External links

Jeison Rosario - Profile, News Archive & Current Rankings at Box.Live

1995 births
Living people
Dominican Republic male boxers
Light-middleweight boxers
World light-middleweight boxing champions
World Boxing Association champions
International Boxing Federation champions
International Boxing Organization champions
Sportspeople from Santo Domingo